Robert Chwiałkowski is a Polish sprint canoer who competed in the late 1980s. He won three medals at the ICF Canoe Sprint World Championships with two silvers (K-4 500 m: 1987, K-4 1000 m: 1989) and a bronze (K-4 1000 m: 1986).

References

Living people
Polish male canoeists
Year of birth missing (living people)
Place of birth missing (living people)
ICF Canoe Sprint World Championships medalists in kayak
20th-century Polish people